Louis Antony Micheloni (12 January 1878 – ??) was a Uruguayan physician, fencer and philatelist.

Early life and education
Micheloni was born on 12 January 1878. He received his advanced education at the Universidad de Montevideo (1895) and the Escuela Superior de Comercio (1899), Montevideo. He received the degree of M. D. from the School of Medicine, George Washington University of Washington, D. C., class of 1910, and in continuation of his studies shortly after went to Italy where he has taken a post graduate course, remaining there for a year and a half.

Career
In the 1910s, Micheloni settled down in New York, making several travels back to Uruguay and some other places in Latin America.

Interests
Micheloni was an artist in drawing and painting, having won first prize and high honors in the Italian School of Art of Montevideo 1904-1907. He was also interested in fencing and was a member of the Fencers Club of New York. He has won several trophies in this country and abroad and held the championship for South America. Dr. Micheloni spoke Spanish, Italian, French and English.

Philately
Micheloni was a well known philatelist, interested in local philately and its organization, and the stamps of Uruguay. He was Secretary of the Uruguay Philatelic Society.

Micheloni wrote many philatelic articles regarding Uruguay philately, most of which were published in Mekeel's Weekly Stamp News, where his advertisements and short notes were also placed.

See also 
 Postage stamps and postal history of Uruguay
 Private stamp issues of Uruguay

References

External links 
 Mekeel's Weekly Stamp News issued in the 1910s. HathiTrust Digital Library

1878 births
Philatelic literature
Uruguayan philatelists
Year of death missing
Philately of Uruguay
George Washington University School of Medicine & Health Sciences alumni
20th-century Uruguayan physicians
Uruguayan male fencers